The 2001 Maui Invitational Tournament was an early-season college basketball tournament that was played, for the 18th time, from November 19 to November 21, 2001. The tournament, which began in 1984, was part of the 2001–02 NCAA Division I men's basketball season.  The tournament was played at the Lahaina Civic Center in Maui, Hawaii and was won by the Duke Blue Devils. It was the third title for both the program and for its head coach Mike Krzyzewski.

Bracket

References

Maui Invitational Tournament
Maui Invitational